Herbert A. Wertheim (born May 23, 1939)  is an American optometrist, inventor, billionaire businessman, and philanthropist. He is the founder and president of Brain Power Incorporated (BPI).

He has served as chairman of the Dr. Herbert and Nicole Wertheim Family Foundation since 1977. Wertheim serves as the Founding Chairman of the FIU Herbert Wertheim College of Medicine, as advisor to The Nicole Wertheim College of Nursing and Health Sciences at Florida International University, and as honorary chairman of The Herbert Wertheim College of Engineering at the University of Florida.

Early life (1939–1957)
Wertheim was born on May 23, 1939, in Philadelphia to Jewish refugee parents who fled Nazi Germany. In 1945, he and his family moved to Hollywood, Florida, and lived in an apartment above the family's bakery. He was diagnosed with dyslexia and started skipping school. His father was often abusive to him, prompting him to run away periodically. At age 16, he faced a judge on truancy charges. He enlisted in the U.S. Navy in 1956 at the age of 17 and was stationed in San Diego. He studied physics and chemistry in the Navy before working on naval aviation. It was here where he made his first investment, buying stock in aviation company Lear Jet. Wertheim is married to his wife, Nicole, for 50 years Wertheim has two children, Erica Wertheim and Vanessa Wertheim.

Education 
Wertheim is a graduate of Brevard Community College (now Eastern Florida State College), Florida, and the University of Florida, where he studied electrical and computer engineering. He also received a B.S. in optical engineering and a Doctor of Optometry from the Southern College of Optometry in association with the University of Tennessee Medical School.

Philanthropy

Florida International University 
Wertheim served as Chairman of the Board of Directors and Board member of the Florida International University Foundation from 1988 through 2001. He was a founding member of the Florida International University Board of Trustees at its establishment by the Florida Legislature in 2000 and was reappointed for a second term  in 2003. As chairman of FIU's Academic Affairs Committee he won approval of the University's Trustees for the Medical College and was asked to chair the Medical College Initiative. After a multi-year legislative campaign including community and university involvement, the FIU Medical College was established.

In May 2009, the Dr. Herbert and Nicole Wertheim Family Foundation made a $20 million contribution which becomes $40 million with state matching funds to establish multiple endowments including eight endowed chairs for the Medical College. In June 2009, the FIU Board of Trustees named the new college the Herbert Wertheim College of Medicine in his honor and named him Founding Chairman of the College of Medicine and Trustee Emeritus of the University.

Wertheim and his wife Nicole have enabled gifts of millions of dollars to the University's music, theater, dance, and business educational programs. These include the 585-seat Concert Hall and a 300-seat Mainstage Theatre at the Herbert and Nicole Wertheim Performing Arts Center (WPAC) at FIU. In September 2013, FIU named the Nicole Wertheim College of Nursing and Health Sciences in honor of Wertheim's wife Nicole.

University of Florida 
In October 2015, the University of Florida announced the naming of the Herbert Wertheim College of Engineering in honor of the Wertheim Family Foundation's gift of $50 million, which will, among other things, fund an 80,000 sq.ft. Engineering Innovation building and foster collaboration between the University of Florida and Florida International University.

In October 2022, he donated $100 million to the University of Florida Health's Scripps Institute, and it was renamed Herbert Wertheim UF Scripps Institute for Biomedical Innovation & Technology.

Other charitable activities 
Wertheim has served as a member of the University of Miami Citizens Board, Dade County Zoological Society, American Heart Association, Lighthouse for the Blind and the Boy Scouts of America. He was a founder of the Friends of Vail and the Vail Valley Citizen of the Year awards. He has also been a board member of the Vail Valley Foundation. He served on the board of the International SeaKeepers Society, an organization of yacht owners that collect scientific data using their boats and crew and then broadcast the data by satellite to universities and governments around the world.

He has served as chairman of the Dr. Herbert and Nicole Wertheim Family Foundation since 1977. It has supported hundreds of local and international educational, cultural, sporting and health care organizations around the world with millions of dollars in financial aid and grants. In 1987 the Foundation was the founding benefactor of the Koala and Asian River Otter projects at Miami MetroZoo. It funded the building of the public radio station in Vail, Colorado and educational TV repeaters in the Vail Valley. The Wertheim Foundation was the first to fund a five-year PBS contract for National Geographic and ten other science and cultural programs for WPBT Miami Public Television.

Awards and recognition 
In April 2011, Wertheim was inducted into the Horatio Alger Association in recognition of his personal and professional successes despite his humble and challenging beginnings.

The La Jolla Institute for Allergy and Immunology elected Wertheim to serve as a director and research advisor in July 2013.

References 

Living people
20th-century American inventors
American health care businesspeople
Eastern Florida State College people
1939 births
American people of German-Jewish descent
Jewish American philanthropists
Giving Pledgers
21st-century philanthropists
American billionaires
21st-century American Jews